Keane Mulready-Woods of Drogheda, County Louth, was an Irish teenager who disappeared on 12 January 2020, and whose dismembered body was then found in Coolock, Co Dublin. More of his remains were found in Drumcondra in a burnt out car the following week.

Background

Early life 
Keane Mulready-Woods grew up in Drogheda and attended St Oliver’s Community College. He was from a working-class family; he was born to Elizabeth and Barry, and had three brothers and one sister. He was a fan of motocross, owned his own scrambler and was described by his cousin as the "best scrambler rider in Drogheda".

Involvement in crime
Mulready-Woods was tempted into petty crime in his mid teens by local criminals with promises of wealth and prestige. His involvement escalated, as he was involved with one of the factions in the Drogheda feud.

The faction began using petrol bombs and pipe bombs to threaten rival criminals and their families. It was also heavily involved in the illegal drug trade in the town and it used intimidation to enforce collection of debts.

Disappearance
Mulready-Woods was last seen around 6 pm on 12 January 2020 at St Dominic's Bridge in Drogheda. He had recently called his mother to ask her to leave money out for his taxi home later that evening. His sister posted a message on Facebook the afternoon of the following day, asking if anyone had seen him.

Human remains found

Coolock
On 13 January 2020 a local man found a sports bag with human remains at the junction of Moatview Gardens and Moatview Drive in Coolock. The bag had been thrown from a dark coloured passing car. The remains were found around 10pm. The bag also contained flip-flops, which were taken as a warning not to cross Lawlor, whose flip-flops had been stolen in the mugging.

Drumcondra
Further human remains, believed to be a head and hands, were found in a burnt-out car in Trinity Terrace, Drumcondra in the early hours of Wednesday 15 January.

Drogheda
The torso of the teen was finally found on a site next to Rathmullen Park in Drogheda on 1 April 2021. A DNA test confirmed the identity of the torso relating to the teen.

Identification
On the night of 15 January, Gardaí confirmed that DNA tests had confirmed that the limbs found in Coolock were those of Keane Mulready-Woods. On Friday 17 January Gardaí confirmed that the partial remains found in the car had been identified as those of Keane Mulready-Woods.

Aftermath

Garda investigation
Gardaí are investigating links between the death of Keane Mulready-Woods and a criminal feud in Drogheda which has claimed three lives. There are incident rooms in Coolock, Mountjoy and Drogheda Garda stations with the investigation being coordinated from the latter.

In the early hours of 20 January, a main suspect in the case was arrested. Gardaí had watched both Dublin Airport and Dublin Port closely because they feared he would flee to England. He was expected to appear in court on charges of breaching bail conditions. The arrest warrant is not related to the death of Keane Mulready-Woods, but to a separate case. He is connected to a crime feud in Drogheda.

Gardaí suspect that the killers intended to dump the remains in front of the homes of the leaders of the gang the teenager was associated with as a warning. They also suspect that this plan was abandoned after those with the remains nearly encountered Gardaí.

Gardaí believe the deceased was killed in Drogheda and have searched the banks of the River Boyne near to a house where they suspect he was killed.

Detectives working on the case have no cause of death to base their inquiry on as the fatal injury is believed to have been dealt to the torso, which was still missing as of February 2020. They have not ruled out the possibility that the torso was disposed of deliberately so as to frustrate the investigation.

Prosecutions have proven to be difficult if remains of the deceased are not found or only partial remains have been found. It has been done in the murder of Elaine O'Hara but Gardaí described that case as an exception and that prosecutions in such cases were "extremely difficult".

Two men were arrested on 20 February 2020.

Funeral
A funeral was held on Thursday 13 February 2020 at Holy Family Church, Ballsgrove, Drogheda. Father Phil Gaffney conducted the funeral service and condemned the killing as well as the feud during the homily. He described the deceased as "young and naive enough to fall in with the wrong people, not knowing or anticipating the dire consequences". He also said "I hope that his death will be a warning to other young teenagers who are being groomed by the ruthless criminals; that the promise of money and gifts will inevitably end in tragedy". He also criticised people who took illegal recreational drugs as fuelling the violence of the feud.

There was a significant Garda presence at the funeral. Several hundred people attended the funeral mass. Gardaí had requested that media did not enter the church during the funeral service. Media had gathered outside.

When the funeral cortege arrived, a young man broke off from the crowd outside the church and approached the media, telling them to leave. He said if they were still outside the church after the funeral was over he would break their cameras.

After the funeral, two men ran over to the media calling them "scum" but they were stopped by Gardaí.

The deceased was buried in Calvary Cemetery, Drogheda.

Gardaí were prepared to keep an eye on social gatherings related to the funeral after the burial.

At the time of his funeral his torso had not been recovered.

Charges
On 28 February 2020 a 50 year old man was charged with impeding the apprehension or prosecution of another person in relation to the death of Keane Mulready-Woods.

Belfast shooting
On 4 April 2020 Robbie Lawlor, aged 36, was shot dead around 11:50am outside a house in Etna Drive, Ardoyne in north Belfast. He was suspected of ordering the murder and dismembering of Keane Mulready-Woods. The man was originally from Dublin, but had lived in County Meath and was heavily involved in organised crime, including the Drogheda feud. He had travelled to Belfast the morning he was shot and the PSNI and Garda Síochána believe he had travelled to Belfast in the hours before he was shot, possibly to collect debts. As well as being a suspect in the death of Keane Mulready-Woods he was suspected of being responsible for a number of other killings. He had been threatened by one faction in the Drogheda feud but was also at odds with a major Dublin criminal who is suspected of several murders including that of Alan Ryan. Three men suspected of the murder were arrested and questioned by the PSNI at Musgrave police station.

Three suspects were arrested on Saturday, a fourth was arrested on Sunday.

The shooting was condemned by Detective Sergeant Jason Murphy, as a murder, as a danger to the local community and due to the additional pressures caused by coronavirus pandemic. The shooting was also condemned by Minister for Justice Naomi Long and Sinn Féin MLA Gerry Kelly.

Lawlor was well known to Gardaí for being involved in serious and organised crime. He had over 100 convictions and had been released from prison in December 2019. He had been warned by Gardaí that his life was in danger before he went to Belfast.

Lawlor was mugged after leaving a gym in December 2019, which was filmed by his assailants. The assailants stole his gym bag and flip-flops and posted photos of them wearing the latter  after the mugging. The assault was allegedly at the behest of a criminal foe of Lawlor. The presence of flip-flops in the bag of Keane Mulready-Woods remains dumped in Coolock was widely interpreted as a threat not to cross Lawlor.

The PSNI suspect that a single gunman shot Lawlor.

Charges in relation to Mulready-Woods death
In October 2020 a 50 year old man from Drogheda was charged with impeding the prosecution or apprehension of another person in relation to the death of Keane Mulready-Woods. The trial is scheduled to begin on 17 January 2022, due to a backlog caused by the COVID-19 pandemic.

On 8 December 2020 a man was arrested in connection with the death of Keane Mulready-Woods. Two more men, both in their early 20s, were arrested in relation to his death on 10 December and detained in Dundalk and Mountjoy Garda stations. The man arrested two days before continued to be held in Drogheda Garda station.

Further arrests
On 17 February 2021 a 29 year old woman who was associated with Paul Crosby was arrested by Gardaí investigating the murder and dismemberment of a 17 year old on 12 January 2020 in Drogheda. She is suspected of playing a central role in the logistics of the murder, including cleaning up the crime scene. A 23 year old man described as "a very minor player" was also arrested and suspected of helping clean up the crime scene. The murder is suspected to have been carried out by the "anti-Maguire" gang in Drogheda.

The 29 year old woman was with Paul Crosby on 13 January 2020 when a gunman tried to target Crosby but shot the driver of their taxi, leaving Crosby uninjured.

On 19 February 2021, Paul Crosby was arrested in Mountjoy Prison and taken to nearby Mountjoy Garda station by Gardaí investigating the same murder. He was brought from prison to the station under a section 42 warrant, which means he can be detained for 24 hours.

On 2 May 2021 three men were arrested as part of the investigation. A man in his late 20s was arrested on 8 May 2021 and being details under section 42 of the Criminal Justice Act 1999.

On 17 May 2021 Paul Crosby appeared before Drogheda District Court sitting in Dundalk Court charged with the murder of Keane Mulready-Woods. In December 2022 he was convicted of facilitating Mulready-Woods' murder.

Men sent forward to Special Criminal Court
On 24 May 2021 two men charged with the murder of Keane Mulready-Woods were sent forward to face trial in the Special Criminal Court.

See also
List of solved missing person cases

References

2020s missing person cases
2020 murders in the Republic of Ireland
Crime in Belfast
Crime in Drogheda
Crime in Dublin (city)
Deaths by person in the Republic of Ireland
Formerly missing people
Male murder victims
Missing person cases in Ireland